OML is an XML format for outlines in information technology.

OML may also refer to:
Old Main Line (disambiguation), various meanings in transportation
Old Mutual, an international insurance company
One More Light, an album by American musicians Linkin Park
Order of Merit List, for the U.K. Order of Merit
Outer mold line, an aeroshell's outer surface, mainly used in the context of aviation, such as in spacecraft boilerplates
 OML, the Indian Railways station code for Omalur Junction railway station, Salem, Tamil Nadu